In linear algebra, the main diagonal (sometimes principal diagonal, primary diagonal, leading diagonal, major diagonal, or good diagonal) of a matrix  is the list of entries  where . All off-diagonal elements are zero in a diagonal matrix. The following four matrices have their main diagonals indicated by red ones:

Antidiagonal

The antidiagonal (sometimes counter diagonal, secondary diagonal, trailing diagonal, minor diagonal, off diagonal, or bad diagonal) of an order  square matrix  is the collection of entries  such that  for all . That is, it runs from the top right corner to the bottom left corner.

See also 
 Trace

References 
 

Matrices